An eyelash (also called lash) (Latin: Cilia) is one of the hairs that grows at the edge of the eyelids. It grows in one layer on the edge of the upper and lower eyelids. Eyelashes protect the eye from debris, dust, and small particles and perform some of the same functions as whiskers do on a cat or a mouse in the sense that they are sensitive to being touched, thus providing a warning that an object (such as an insect) is near the eye (which then closes reflexively).

The Ancient Greek word for eyelash is βλέφαρον (transliterated as blepharon), which is seen as a root in biological terms like Blephara.

Structure

Development
The eyelashes of the human embryo develop from the ectoderm between the 22nd and 26th week of pregnancy. Natural eyelashes do not grow beyond a certain length, and fall off by themselves without any need for trimming. Eyelashes take about seven to eight weeks to grow back if pulled out, but constant pulling may lead to permanent damage. Their color may differ from that of the hair, although they tend to be dark on someone with dark hair and lighter on someone with light hair. Eyelash hair is not androgenic and is therefore not affected by puberty.

Glands
The follicles of eyelashes are associated with a number of glands known as the glands of Zeis and the glands of Moll.

Clinical significance

There are a number of diseases or disorders involving the eyelashes:
Madarosis is the loss of eyelashes.
Blepharitis is the irritation of the lid margin, where eyelashes join the eyelid.  The eyelids are red and itching, the skin often becomes flaky, and the eyelashes may fall out.
Distichiasis is the abnormal growth of lashes from certain areas of the eyelid.
Trichiasis refers to ingrown eyelashes.
Eyelashes may become infested with parasitic crab louse.
An external hordeolum, or stye, is a purulent inflammation of infected eyelash follicles and surrounding sebaceous (Gland of Zeis) and apocrine (Moll's gland) glands of the lid margin.
Trichotillomania is a disorder that urges the sufferer to pull out scalp hair, eyelashes, etc.
Demodex folliculorum (or the demodicid) is a small mite that lives harmlessly in eyelash and other hair follicles, and about 20% of people have these mites living on them. Occasionally they may cause blepharitis.

Eyelash and eyebrow transplant surgeries may help to reconstruct or thicken lashes or eyebrow hair.

Society and culture

Cosmetics

Long eyelashes are considered a sign of beauty in many cultures. Accordingly, some people seek to enhance their eyelash length artificially, using eyelash extensions. On the other hand, Hadza women are known to trim their own eyelashes.
 
Kohl, a black putty (usually antimony sulfide or lead sulfide), has been worn as far back as the Bronze Age to darken the edge of the eyelid (just at the bottom of the eyelashes). In Ancient Egypt, it was used as well by the wealthy and the royal to beautify their eyes. Modern eye makeup includes mascara, eyeliner, eye putty, and eye shadow to emphasize the eyes. The twentieth century saw the beginning of convincing false eyelashes, popular in the 1960s. There are also different tools that can be used on the lashes such as eyelash curler or mascara shield (also named mascara guard or eye makeup helper).

Permanent eyelash tints and eyelash extensions have also become popular procedures, even in fairly basic salons. It is also possible to get eyelash transplants, which are similar in nature to hair transplantation often done on the head. Since the hair is transplanted from the hair on the head, the new eyelashes will continue to grow like head hair and will need to be trimmed regularly.

Latisse was introduced in the first quarter of 2009 by Allergan as the first drug to receive FDA approval for eyelash growth. Latisse is a solution of bimatoprost, the active component of the glaucoma medication Lumigan. According to Allergan, noticeable eyelash growth occurs within 16 weeks. Growth is reported to occur primarily on the upper eyelashes. In addition, the past decade has seen the rapid increase in the development of eyelash conditioners. These conditioners are designed to increase the health and length of lashes. Many utilize seed extract, minerals, and other chemicals to achieve these results.

Cosmetic companies have recently relied on scientific research of prostaglandins and the Wnt/b-catenin signaling pathways to develop eyelash products. Although bimatoprost is effective in promoting increased growth of healthy eyelashes and adnexal hairs, its effectiveness in patients with eyelash alopecia areata is debatable. Some cosmetic brands have begun using Peptides in their formulation rather than prostaglandins because of regulatory rules in places like Canada and California.

In other animals

Lashes, being hair, are found in mammals. Camels' lashes are remarkably long and thick. Horses and cows feature eyelashes as well. Inherited eyelash problems are common in some breeds of dogs as well as horses.

Eyelashes are an uncommon but not unknown feature in birds. Hornbills have prominent eyelashes (vestigial feathers with no barbs), as do ostriches. Amongst the reptiles, only Eyelash vipers show a set of modified scales over the eyes which look much like eyelashes.

See also
Eyelash extensions, used to enhance the length, curliness, fullness, and thickness of natural eyelashes

References

External links

 
Facial features